The 2015–16 curling season began in August 2015 and ended in May 2016.

Note: In events with two genders, the men's tournament winners will be listed before the women's tournament winners.

Curling Canada sanctioned events
This section lists events sanctioned by and/or conducted by Curling Canada (formerly the Canadian Curling Association). The following events in bold have been confirmed by Curling Canada as are part of the 2015–16 Season of Champions programme.

Other events
Note: Events that have not been placed on the CCA's list of sanctioned events are listed here. If an event is listed on the CCA's final list for the 2015–16 curling season, it will be moved up to the "CCA-sanctioned events" section.

World Curling Tour
Grand Slam events in bold.See also List of teams on the 2015–16 World Curling TourMen's events

Women's events

Mixed doubles events

WCT Order of Merit rankings

WCT Money List

Curling Canada MA Cup
The MA Cup is awarded to the Curling Canada Member Association (MA) who has had the most success during the season in Curling Canada-sanctioned events. Events included the Canadian mixed championship, Travelers Curling Club Championship (added to the MA Cup for this season), men's and women's juniors championships, the Scotties, the Brier, the men's and women's senior championships and the national wheelchair championship. Points were awarded based on placement in each of the events, with the top association receiving 14 points and each association under receiving points in decrements of one point.

StandingsFinal standings''

References

External links
World Curling Tour Home
Season of Champions Home

2015-16
2015-16
2015-16